The Montana Museum of Art & Culture, or the , is a University of Montana art museum in Missoula, Montana with a collection of over 11,000objects, many of which are of the contemporary American West.

History of the MMAC and its Permanent Collection 
The Montana Museum of Art & Culture was established shortly after the founding of the University of Montana in Missoula, Montana. The year was 1895 and the state's flagship university, established in 1893, had its first President, Oscar J. Craig, and fifty enrolled students. A request to the Smithsonian Museum of Natural History in Washington D.C. for some specimens to support academic disciplines at the new university resulted in the first recorded donation, consisting of minerals, sea invertebrates, fish, and plants. While objects of a scientific nature are no longer a part of the museum, the MMAC's Permanent Collection has grown to include close to 11,000 works of art and cultural artifacts.

At the turn of the last century, collections continued to be acquired and were initially housed on the first floor of the new University Hall, designed by architect A.J. Gibson. Locations within the "Main Hall", as it has come to be known, changed several times, due to growth of the university.  In 1912, the museum space was abandoned altogether to make way for a Law Library and the collections remained dormant until the conclusion of World War I. In the early 1920s, the University of Montana and museum experienced another period of intense growth. The first major donations from the estates of A.J. and Maud Gibson, John Ellsworth Lewis, and famous western artist E.S. Paxson established the foundations of the Permanent Collection. As the original several hundred minerals and objects from the sea became a teaching collection for the sciences, the museum's holdings expanded to include a vast treasury of fine art, sculpture, ceramics, textiles, furniture, and other important works from various cultures, countries, and periods.

In 1937, Art Digest and Newsweek magazines praised the museum, the latter calling it, "the first art museum in the Inland Northwest". A pivotal moment came in 1948 with the receipt of two significant donations of fine art by collector Stella Louise Duncan and Montana artist Fra Dana. Other notable donations included: Alfred F. Penard's collection of Native American artifacts; Robert Lehman's collection of 16th century Italian majolica; New Deal-era prints from the General Services Administration in Washington, D.C.; Carolyn McGill's donation of 1,200 objects; Helen Cappadocia's textile and book collection; the Ben Steele Collection of P.O.W. drawings and paintings; and the recent acquisition of European paintings and sculptures belonging to Montana Senator and "Copper King" William A. Clark.

The strength of this diverse collection lies in works by celebrated artists from the Rocky Mountain West, including Rudy Autio, Fra Dana, Edgar Paxson, Frederick Remington, and Joseph Henry Sharp. The American holdings also include artists William Merritt Chase, Fra Dana, Rockwell Kent, Robert Motherwell, and Andy Warhol, among others. The Permanent Collection also features Contemporary Native American art including works by Percy Bull Child, Jim Denomie, Gloria Emerson, Jay Laber, Erica Lord, Neil Parsons, and many others. The collection of historic and modern European works of art ranges from a Greek ceramic vase from around the 3rd century to works by contemporary artists. Of particular note are works of art from the Middle Ages to the 19th century, including paintings by masters such as Jean-Baptiste-Camille Corot, Honoré Daumier, Eugène Delacroix, Jean-Honoré Fragonard, Jean-François Millet, and prints by Henri de Toulouse-Lautrec, Giovanni Battista Piranesi, and Rembrandt Van Rijn. Among significant European artists from the 20th century are: Peter Blake, Marc Chagall, Salvador Dalí, Alberto Giacometti, Käthe Kollwitz, Joan Miró, and Pablo Picasso. Collections of vintage clothing and theatrical costumes, furnishings lent to historic home museums across the state, a collection of Asian art, including Southeast Asian textiles, and public art sited across the University of Montana campus round out the MMAC's Permanent Collection. Long-term loans to the museum include a collection of New Deal era prints Courtesy of the U.S. General Services Administration in Washington D.C. and modernists paintings and drawings from the Henry Meloy Collection. The MMAC acquires new works for its Permanent Collection through donations and, occasionally, through purchase. There is a designated fund for acquiring art by students at the University of Montana. The Collections Committee guides the scope and growth of the Permanent Collection by reviewing works for acquisition.

The MMAC's present location in the Meloy and Paxson Galleries was made possible by the completion of the PARTV Center in 1985. Two spaces for exhibition and storage were designated for what was then known as the "Museum of Fine Arts". In 1995, under the leadership of Museum Director and Curator Maggie Mudd, the galleries and new storage spaces were retrofitted with security and climate control. In 2001, the museum was renamed the "Montana Museum of Art and Culture" and was designated one of three state museums, along with the Montana Historical Society in Helena and the Museum of the Rockies in Bozeman. Barbara Koostra became director in 2008. In 2019, University of Montana Art History & Criticism Professor Dr. H. Rafael Chacón was named Bruce and Suzanne Director of the MMAC.

The MMAC is an integral resource for the University of Montana's academic programs and demonstrates the importance that the University of Montana places on interdisciplinary education and cross-cultural understanding as well as public service. By way of its exhibitions, collections, and educational programs, the MMAC creates stimulating opportunities that benefit faculty members and students from across campus and the statewide community. As a center of education and visual exploration, the MMAC offers the community interdisciplinary learning opportunities that promote an understanding of diverse cultures through its Permanent Collection, traveling exhibitions, educational programs including student internships, workshops, lectures, artist talks, and gallery tours.  The MMAC serves both the UM and regional community, including K-12 schools and lifelong learners.

References

Art museums and galleries in Montana
University of Montana
Museums in Missoula, Montana
University museums in Montana